The Nanpu Power Plant is a gas-fired power plant in Cianjhen District, Kaohsiung, Taiwan. With the installed capacity of 1,118 MW, the plant is Taiwan's third largest gas-fired power plant after Tatan Power Plant and Tunghsiao Power Plant.

Events

30 June 2003
The power plant Unit 4 began commercial operation after performance tests with a total capacity of 248 MW.

4 March 2010
Generators in two units of the plant tripped at 8:18 a.m following the 2010 Kaohsiung earthquakes.

Awards
The power plant won the 2006 Water Conservation Outstanding Performance Awards for its effort in implementing water saving at the plant, especially in the recycling and reusing of boiler drain water and waste water.

Transportation
Nanpu Power Plant is accessible within walking distance South West from Shihjia Station of Kaohsiung MRT.

See also

 List of power stations in Taiwan
 Electricity sector in Taiwan

References

1993 establishments in Taiwan
Buildings and structures in Kaohsiung
Energy infrastructure completed in 1993
Natural gas-fired power stations in Taiwan